Frank Edgar Staton  (1864 – before 1945) was an English footballer who played in the Football League for Stoke.

Career
Staton was born in Stoke-upon-Trent and played football for local side Goldenhill Wanderers before joining Stoke at the start of the first season of the Football League. He made his League debut on 8 September 1888, as a forward for Stoke in a 2–0 defeat by West Bromwich Albion at the Victoria Ground. Staton scored Stoke's first ever league goal in a 5–1 defeat to Aston Villa on 15 September 1888 played at Wellington Road. He scored again two weeks later against Accrington at Victoria Ground on 29 September 1888. In 1889 he decided to move to Wolverhampton based Stafford Road.

Career statistics
Source:

References

English footballers
Stoke City F.C. players
English Football League players
Year of death missing
1864 births
Stafford Road F.C. players
Association football forwards